Sir George Wigram Allen  (16 May 1824 – 23 July 1885) was an Australian politician and philanthropist. He was Speaker in the New South Wales Legislative Assembly 1875–1883. Allen was held in high esteem. As speaker he showed dignity, courtesy and ability; it was said of him: 'A man of calm judgment and much practical wisdom'.

Early life
Allen was born in Surry Hills, New South Wales, the eldest son of George Allen (attorney and solicitor) and his wife Jane, née Bowden. He was educated under William Cape and at Sydney College, where he showed ability in classics and mathematics. In 1841, Allen was articled to his father and he became a solicitor in 1846.

Legal career
The following year Allen entered a partnership with his father as a solicitor and today that firm is known as Allens and is the oldest in Australia. He was also a director of many public companies including the Bank of New South Wales.

Public office
In 1859 Allen became the first chairman and mayor of the Municipality of The Glebe, a position he held until 1877. He was appointed a commissioner of national education in 1853 and held the position until 1867 and was nominated to the New South Wales Legislative Council in 1860 and remained there until May 1861. In 1869 Allen was elected a member of the New South Wales Legislative Assembly for Glebe, and from December 1873 to February 1875 was Minister of Justice and Public Instruction in the first ministry of Henry Parkes. In the following March he was elected Speaker and remained in that position until January 1883. Allen retired from politics in August 1883 and died suddenly on 23 July 1885.

Marriage

Allen married Marian Boyce (1835–1914), eldest daughter of the Rev. William Boyce, in July 1851 and they lived at Strathmore, opposite his father's home Toxteth Park. In 1881 they moved to Toxteth Park having added a third storey, a tower and various embellishments such as a ballroom. The Allens entertained there on a grand scale. Lady Allen was an active charitable worker. She was involved with the boarding out of orphan children from the Benevolent Asylum and was a co-founder of the Royal Alexandra Hospital for Children. The marriage produced six sons and four daughters.

Honours
He was knighted in 1877.

In 1884 he was appointed a Knight Commander of the Order of St Michael and St George (KCMG).

References

 

1824 births
1885 deaths
Members of the New South Wales Legislative Assembly
Members of the New South Wales Legislative Council
Members of Newington College Council
Australian Methodists
Speakers of the New South Wales Legislative Assembly
Lawyers from Sydney
19th-century Australian politicians
Mayors of The Glebe